Desolate is the second studio EP by American punk rock band Set The Sun, released on September 21, 2011.

Music
With Desolate Set The Sun has been stated to incorporate elements of post-hardcore, metalcore, electronicore, deathcore, hardcore punk and southern hardcore leading to them being compared to the likes of Wage War, August Burns Red Bring Me the Horizon, Chelsea Grin and Whitechapel.

Father Said has been praised for its infection hooks and compared to Bring Me the Horizon's Happy Song, whereas The Prince has been called deathcore and praised for being "maintaining its heaviness, even when melodic".

Additionally, the band have been able to mature their sound by pushing its synths into the background, improving lead guitar work and relying less on chugging.

Track listing

Personnel
Nate Anderson - Unclean vocals
David Southern - Clean vocals, rhythm guitar
Arturo Pina - Lead guitar
Dakota Price - Bass
Brandon Daniels - Keyboard
Alex Summers - Drums

References 

2011 EPs
Metalcore EPs
Post-hardcore EPs
The White Noise albums